The Seaford branch line is a rural railway line in East Sussex constructed in 1864 primarily to serve the port of Newhaven and the town of Seaford. It now sees fairly regular trains across the line except for the branch to the closed  station.

History
Engineered by the London, Brighton and South Coast Railway's Chief Engineer Frederick Banister, the first section of the line was opened in 1847 to aid the transport of goods to and from Newhaven. The line was extended in 1864 to serve the holiday town of Seaford. There used to be extensive sidings at Newhaven Docks and even a railway swing bridge over the River Ouse to connect to the other side. These have now been removed or have become overgrown, as has the defunct  station, which has been fenced off from the public. Once a thriving station serving ferries to and from France, the walk of just under 1/4 mile to  station and the cessation of winter ferries forced its closure. The line was electrified (750 V DC third rail) by the Southern Railway in 1935.

Route
The branch line starts at Southerham Junction on the East Coastway Line.
The following station  no longer serves ferries to France.
Originally built to link with cross-channel ferries, this short branch line is now closed to passengers, but occasional freight trains still use the sidings.
The line then becomes a single-track and is one of a few single-track third-rail lines in the country.
The line then straightens out and calls at two more stations.
 (serving the village of Bishopstone and the western end of Seaford) and
 (the end of the line, serving Seaford town centre)

Train services
Train services are operated by Southern. Class 313s and Class 377 "Electrostars" are used on the line to transport passengers to Lewes, Brighton and London.

The normal off peak train service on the line is two trains per hour between Brighton and Seaford calling at London Road, Moulsecoomb, Falmer, Lewes, then 1tph at Southease, Newhaven Town, then only peak hours at Newhaven Harbour then all stations on the rest of the branch line.

At off peak times, connections with services towards London can be made at Lewes.

Passenger volume
Comparing the number of passengers in year beginning April 2002 to the year beginning April 2010, Southease has increased by 96%, Newhaven Town by 45%, Bishopstone by 58% and Seaford by 56%. Newhaven Harbour has declined by 51%.

References

Rail transport in East Sussex
Railway lines opened in 1864
Railway lines in South East England